This is a list of governors of the Roman province of Syria. From 27 BC, the province was governed by an imperial legate of praetorian rank. The province was merged with Roman Judaea in 135 AD to form Syria Palaestina until 193 AD when it was divided into Syria Coele and Syria Phoenicia. In c. 415 AD, Syria Coele was divided into Syria Prima and Syria Secunda. During the reign of Theodosius I (379 – 395), Syria Phoenicia was divided into Phoenicia Maritima and Phoenicia Libanensis.

Proconsular governors of Syria (65–27 BC) 

 65–62: Marcus Aemilius Scaurus
 61–60: Lucius Marcius Philippus
 59–58: Gnaeus Cornelius Lentulus Marcellinus
 57–54: Aulus Gabinius
 54–53: Marcus Licinius Crassus
 53–51: Gaius Cassius Longinus
 51–50: Marcus Calpurnius Bibulus
 50/49: Veiento
 49–48: Metellus Scipio
 47–46: Sextus Julius Caesar
 46–44: Quintus Caecilius Bassus
 45: Gaius Antistius Vetus
 44: Lucius Staius Murcus
 44–43: Quintus Marcius Crispus
 44–42: Gaius Cassius Longinus
 41–40: Lucius Decidius Saxa
 40–39: Parthian occupation
 39–38: Publius Ventidius Bassus
 38–37: Gaius Sosius
 35: Lucius Munatius Plancus
 34/33–33/32: Lucius Calpurnius Bibulus
 30: Quintus Didius
 29: Marcus Valerius Messalla Corvinus
 28–25: Cicero Minor

Propraetorial Imperial Legates of Roman Syria (27 BC to 135 AD)

Proconsular Imperial Legates of Syria Palestina (135 AD to 193 AD)

Proconsular Imperial Legates of Syria Coele (193 AD to c. 295 AD)

Propraetorial Imperial Legates of Syria Phoenicia (193 AD to c. 295 AD)

Consularis Governors of Syria Coele (c. 295 AD to c. 415 AD)

Consularis Governors of Syria Phoenicia (c. 295 AD to c. 395 AD)

Footnotes

Bibliography
 Schürer Emil, Vermes Geza, Millar Fergus, The history of the Jewish people in the age of Jesus Christ (175 B.C.-A.D. 135), Volume I, Edinburgh 1973, p. 243-266 (Survey of the Roman Province of Syria from 63 B.C. to A.D. 70).
 Linda Jones Hall, Roman Berytus: Beirut in late antiquity (2004)
 Martindale, J. R.; Jones, A. H. M, The Prosopography of the Later Roman Empire, Vol. I AD 260–395, Cambridge University Press (1971)

Roman governors of Syria
Roman governors of Syria
 
Roman governors of Syria
Roman governors of Syria
Syria

ca:Síria (província romana)#Governadors romans de Síria
pl:Syria (prowincja rzymska)